Moses Muhangi is a former Ugandan professional boxer, entrepreneur and the current president of the Uganda Boxing Federation. He is an appointed Committee member on the Africa Boxing Confederation. He is also an appointed member of both the International Boxing Association (AIBA) Marketing Commission and also the AIBA National Federations Election Observers Commission since 2021. [[International Boxing Association (AIBA).

Career
Moses has been an amateur boxer for 10 years and won a National Medal award for National Open Amateur Boxing competition. He is also vested in Real Estate in Uganda, and also runs Gong Records, a DJ training School.

Uganda Boxing Federation
Muhangi was elected as the new president of the Uganda Boxing Federation in January 2018. His election was however refuted by the incumbent president Kenneth Gimugu who petitioned the high court to nullify Muhangi's election. High Court judge Lady Justice Lydia Mugambe ruled in favour of Moses Muhangi on the 2nd of March 2018. His presidency still faced rejection from boxing clubs like Mutajjazi Boxing Club, a club that had endorsed him for the position.

In his first months in office, Muhangi introduced a five-point program (Accountability, Structures, Transparency, Discipline, Exchange programs) that changed the federation. The federation saw an increase in the registered number of boxers from 110 to 481 and schools contesting for boxing championships increased from 10 to 27.

Muhangi petitioned the Minister of Education and Sports seeking fair distribution of sports budget funds for 2019 - 2010 financial year. FUFA had been allocated Shs10bn of the Shs17.4bn sports budget, leaving the rest of the federations to share only Shs4bn while Shs3bn went to the National Council of Sports.

Personal life

He was born on 5 November 1990, in Mulago Kampala to  Mr. John Patrick Kapere and Miss Nakawuka Florence. Moses is the first born of the couple's 7 children.

He attended Uganda Martyrs Primary school Mbarara, Kibuli Secondary School for his O’level education, and later joined  Kitante Hill School for his high school education. He is an alumnus of Makerere University where he attained a bachelor's degree in Statistics.

He also holds a Diploma in LAW from the Law Development Centre, International Technical Officer for  Football Boxing Certificate(IBA- international boxing association), Certificate in Political Science  from Kyankwanzi National training institute for the military and Political Science.

References

1984 births
Sportspeople from Kampala
Ugandan male boxers
Living people